A criminal proceeding in French law is one carried out in the name of society against a person accused of a  by applying the French penal code. It is taken in the name of society, in that its goal is to stop disruption of public order, and not to abate  done to a specific person, which is governed by French civil law.

Terminology 

The term  is translated in various ways in English sources, depending on context. The literal, word-for-word translation is "public action", which is used sometimes in English texts, always with an explanation, as it has little meaning outside the context of French law. What the term  actually refers to is "criminal proceedings", or "public prosecution".

The term public in this expression is used in the same sense as in the public prosecutor who is responsible for prosecutions carried out on behalf of society (i.e., the public), and thus the term  is generally rendered in English as "public prosecutor", or generically as the "public prosecutor's office".

Initiation of criminal proceedings 

Initiating a criminal proceeding is the follow-up to the commission an offense by introducing it into the jurisdictional phase of criminal proceedings.

The entity responsible for initiating a criminal proceeding in France is usually the Public Prosecutor's Office, a hierarchical corps of magistrates charged with carrying out the prosecutions. Alongside them, other civil servants are, for certain infractions, empowered to begin other proceedings, notably for indirect taxes, and for the Corps of Bridges, Waters and Forests. The victim of a crime may also initiate the proceeding.

The object of the prosecution, is the accused perpetrator of the infraction, against whom the criminal proceeding is brought. They must be identifiable, although not necessarily identified, for the criminal proceeding to begin.

The public prosecutor receives complaints and decides how to proceed. After receiving a complaint, they may decide to prosecute, or to resort to an alternative procedure, such  a warning, referral to a professional health or social structure, reparation of the damage, or other alternatives, or may decide not to prosecute. 

If prosecution moves forward, the victim or complainant is informed, and in criminal matters the prosecutor requests the opening of an investigation ( by means of an opening indictment against a named person (or against a John Doe defendant: ,) stating the facts that are the subject of the prosecution and the penal code item that applies to it. The prosecutor may either refer the case to the investigating court by way of an introductory indictment, or refer it directly to the trial court by direct summons ( or other method. For non-criminal offenses such as traffic violations, the prosecutor can use the simplified  procedure. For middling offenses punishable by a fine or less than five years imprisonment, the prosecutor may use the CPRC procedure, and for minor offenses, the prosecutor can opt either to initiate an investigation as for other offenses, or to issue a warning or a direct summons.

References
Notes

Citations

Works cited

French criminal law